Two ships of the Royal Navy have been named HMS Westminster after the City of Westminster; or the Duke of Westminster:

  was a W-class destroyer launched in 1918 and sold in 1948.
  is a Type 23 frigate launched in 1992 and currently in service.

Battle honours
Ships named Westminster have earned the following battle honours:
North Sea 1939–45
English Channel 1943

Royal Navy ship names